Marco Bellodis (born 23 February 1955) is an Italian bobsledder. He competed in the two man event at the 1984 Winter Olympics.

References

External links
 

1955 births
Living people
Italian male bobsledders
Olympic bobsledders of Italy
Bobsledders at the 1984 Winter Olympics
People from Cortina d'Ampezzo
Sportspeople from the Province of Belluno